Annabel Margaret Young (born 1956) is a former New Zealand politician. She was a Member of Parliament from 1997 to 2002, representing the National Party.

Early life and family 
Before entering politics, Young worked as a tax specialist, being a lawyer and chartered accountant. She also spent nine years in the territorial army signal corps.

Young's father, Bill Young, was also a National MP, representing the Miramar electorate from 1966 to 1981. One of Young's sisters, Nicola, is a Wellington City Councillor and stood as a candidate in the Rongotai electorate in the 2005 general election, however lost to the incumbent, Annette King. Another sister, Rosemary, married National MP Max Bradford.

Member of Parliament

Young stood as a list-only candidate in the 1996 general election but was not immediately successful. She eventually entered Parliament on 23 April 1997, having been the next candidate on National's party list when list MP Jim Gerard resigned. As Gerard had been the first list MP to resign after New Zealand adopted the mixed-member proportional electoral system in 1996, Young was the first list MP to be elected not at a general election.

In Young's first term as a list MP, despite being a Wellingtonian, she was assigned by the party to be based in Hawke's Bay. The National Party did not stand an electorate candidate in Wellington Central in the 1999 election (having previously endorsed ACT leader Richard Prebble for the seat). Young again stood as a list-only candidate, campaigning in Wellington city, and was re-elected. With the National Party now in opposition, Young served as National's revenue spokesperson under both Jenny Shipley and Bill English, based in Wellington.

In 2000, during debate on the Employment Relations Bill, Young was photographed yawning, and the photograph was subsequently published in The Evening Post. This prompted Speaker of the House Jonathan Hunt to ban television cameras and newspaper photographers from the House of Representatives.

In the 2002 election Young stood for a third time as a list-only candidate but, at 33rd on the list and the lowest of National's sitting MPs, was ranked too low to escape the collapse of National's vote that year. She had sought nomination to be the National candidate in Wellington Central, but lost to Hekia Parata. Also at that election, Young endorsed the candidacy of Judith Collins—a long-time friend—for the National candidacy in the new Clevedon electorate, over sitting MP Warren Kyd.

Life after parliament
After leaving Parliament, Young was tax director of the New Zealand Institute of Chartered Accountants. In 2005, she became chief executive of Federated Farmers, and in 2008 moved to the Pharmacy Guild of New Zealand as Chief Executive. She resigned from the Pharmacy Guild of New Zealand in April 2012 and later became executive director of the New Zealand Shipping Federation.

She has also written a book, The Good Lobbyist's Guide, about the most effective ways for citizens to become involved in the political process.

Notes

References

1956 births
Living people
New Zealand National Party MPs
Women members of the New Zealand House of Representatives
New Zealand list MPs
Unsuccessful candidates in the 1996 New Zealand general election
Members of the New Zealand House of Representatives
Unsuccessful candidates in the 2002 New Zealand general election
20th-century New Zealand politicians
21st-century New Zealand politicians
20th-century New Zealand women politicians
21st-century New Zealand women politicians